The 2022 Horizon League women's basketball tournament is the final event of the 2021–22 women's basketball season for the Horizon League. It began on March 1, 2022 and will end on March 8; first-round and quarterfinal games are played at the home courts of the higher seeds, with all remaining games at Indiana Farmers Coliseum in Indianapolis. The winner will receive the conference's automatic berth into the NCAA tournament.

Seeds 
All conference members are participating in the tournament, with the top four teams in the regular-season conference standings receiving byes to the quarterfinals. Tiebreakers used are 1) Head-to-head results, 2) comparison of records against individual teams in the conference starting with the top-ranked team and working down and 3) NCAA NET rankings on the first available report after the regular season is complete.

Schedule

Bracket

References 

2021–22 Horizon League women's basketball season
Horizon League women's basketball tournament
College sports in Indiana
Basketball competitions in Indianapolis
Horizon League women's basketball tournament
Horizon League women's basketball tournament